Universal Mother is the fourth album by Irish singer Sinéad O'Connor, released on September 13, 1994.

"That album was the first attempt to try to expose what was really underneath a lot of the anger of the other records," she explained. "George Michael told me he loved that record, but could only listen to it once because it was so painful. He had to hide it."

Background 
In 1993, O'Connor started taking singing lessons in the style of bel canto. This inspired her to "talk about the things that [she] really wanted to talk about".

Music and Lyrics 
The first track, "Germaine", is a recording of feminist Germaine Greer speaking about cooperation as an alternative to patriarchy.

"Am I a Human?" is by O'Connor's son Jake, recorded when he was a child. "Famine" is a hip hop track about the Great Famine, and how it impacted Ireland.

The last song, "Thank You For Hearing Me", was written about O'Connor's breakup with musician Peter Gabriel, and features a trance-like backing track. The majority of the songs use "delicate piano-based arrangements".

Artwork 
O'Connor painted the cover art, which was inspired by a rebirthing session she experienced, and her song "All Babies".

Critical reception
In Hot Press, Bill Graham said that it is "definitely the record of an artist determined to restart, with a totally new set of basic principles". Noting the album had divided critical opinion, he suggested that its art-as-therapy approach resembled early solo work by John Lennon. O'Connor explores "the uncharted depths" of "the real loveless family traumas" which mainstream, predominantly male, rock music tends to avoid, and Graham believes her journey is made more intense by her identity "as both a mother and a daughter". Listening to the album can be "unnerving", as O'Connor "can still sing like an angel but she also sometimes writes lyrics like an emotional dyslexic." Its predominant style is "a bare chamber-folk."

For Rolling Stone, Stephanie Zacharek characterized Universal Mother as "record making as therapy", and described it as tenderhearted and protective.

Track listing

Note: "Famine" quotes the song "Eleanor Rigby" by The Beatles.

Personnel
Credits adapted from the album's liner notes.
Sinéad O'Connor – vocals, piano
John Reynolds – drums, programming
Dave Clayton – keyboards, programming
Marco Pirroni, Ivan Gilliland – guitar
Tim Simenon – programming
Nicky Scott, Matthew Seligman, Clare Kenny – bass
Phil Coulter – piano, keyboards, backing vocals 
John O'Cane – cello
Voice Squad – backing vocals
Irish Chamber Orchestra – strings

Charts

Certifications and sales

References

1994 albums
Sinéad O'Connor albums
Albums produced by Tim Simenon
Albums produced by Phil Coulter